Aleksandr Vitalyevich Grigoryan (born 28 September 1966) is an Armenian professional football coach and a former player. He also holds Russian citizenship.

Managerial career
In August 2015, Grigoryan left his role as consultant to Pakhtakor Tashkent.

On 5 January 2017 Grigoryan and SKA-Khabarovsk parted ways by mutual agreement, taking over as manager of Anzhi Makhachkala on the same day. Following Anzhi's defeat to Dynamo Moscow on 12 August 2017, Grigoryan resigned as the club's manager, before being appointed FC Ararat Moscow's new manager two days later.

He was hired as the manager of Luch-Energiya Vladivostok on 26 December 2017. He was fired from Luch-Energiya on 20 April 2018.

On 19 October 2019 Grigoryan left FC Tambov by mutual consent after they lost their 4th game in a row and remained at the last place in the Russian Premier League.

On 24 November 2019, Grigoryan was appointed as manager of FC Urartu after the resignation of Ilshat Fayzulin. He left FC Urartu on 10 March 2021.

On 20 May 2021, Grigoryan was announced as FC Alashkerts new Head Coach. Grigoryan left Alashkert on 22 July 2021 due to his wife's poor health, returning to the club on 31 July 2021.On September 20 , 2021 , he announced his retirement.

From September 2021 to October 2022 - head coach of the CSKA women's football team.

References

External links
 Profile at Footballfacts
 Profile at fckhimki.ru

1966 births
Living people
Footballers from Yerevan
Armenian footballers
Armenian football managers
Russian footballers
Russian football managers
FC Nizhny Novgorod managers
FC Khimki managers
FC Luch Vladivostok managers
FC SKA-Khabarovsk managers
FC Alashkert players
Russian Premier League managers
FC Anzhi Makhachkala managers
FC Tosno managers
FC Ararat Moscow managers
FC Urartu managers
FC Alashkert managers
Association footballers not categorized by position
Russian expatriate football managers